Zhang Yanyuan (c. 815- c. 877), courtesy name Aibin (爱宾), was a Chinese art historian, calligrapher, and painter of the late Tang Dynasty.

Biography
Zhang was born to a high-ranking family in present-day Yuncheng, Shanxi. He wrote several works about art and calligraphy, among them Fashu Yaolu (法書要錄, "Compendium of Calligraphy"), a collection of poems on color paper, and Lidai Minghua Ji (歷代名畫記, "Famous Paintings through History"), a general arts book about famous historical paintings. Zhang created his own style of art history writing, combining historical facts and art criticism. His book also described the painter's lives thoroughly, including biography and works.

Zhang's art theory consists of several distinctive features. He agreed with the theory of Xie He that art had moral and political functions; he stressed the importance of originality and creativity in painting, opposing to stereotyped painting styles; and he was adamant that the painter's background had a great influence on the painting.

References

External links
 Art Historian Zhang Yanyuan

9th-century Chinese calligraphers
9th-century Chinese historians
9th-century Chinese painters
Chinese art historians
Tang dynasty calligraphers
Tang dynasty historians
Tang dynasty painters
Year of birth uncertain
Year of death unknown